The 1990–91 Stanford Cardinal men's basketball team represented Stanford University as a member of the Pacific-10 Conference during the 1990–91 NCAA Division I men's basketball season. They were led by fifth-year head coach Mike Montgomery.

Roster

Schedule and results

|-
!colspan=9 style=| Regular season

|-
!colspan=9 style=| NIT

Schedule Source:

References

Stanford Cardinal men's basketball seasons
Stanford
Stanford